The men's individual trampoline competition at the 2006 Asian Games in Doha, Qatar was held on 11 and 12 December 2006 at the Aspire Hall 2.

Schedule
All times are Arabia Standard Time (UTC+03:00)

Results

Qualification

Final

References

Results

External links
Official website

Trampoline Men